Otto III, Duke of Pomerania (29 May 1444 – 7 September 1464) was a member of the House of Griffins and a Duke of Pomerania-Stettin.

Life 
Otto III was the only son of Duke Joachim I "the Younger" of Pomerania, ruler of Pomerania-Stettin, and his wife Elizabeth of Brandenburg. After his father died in 1451, his mother married again in 1453, with Duke Wartislaw X of Pomerania-Wolgast.  The young Otto, heir of Pomerania-Stettin, was educated at the court of the Elector Frederick II of Brandenburg (1413–1471), his uncle and guardian.

When Duke Wartislaw IX of Pomerania-Wolgast died in 1457, his will named not only his sons Eric II and Wartislaw X, Otto's stepfather, as heir, but also young Otto III.  An inheritance dispute arose, is which Frederick II supported Otto, and also used the opportunity to meddle in the affairs of Pomerania.

In 1460, Otto III was declared an adult, at the request of the Estates of Pomerania.  This ended the regency by Brandenburg; instead the 15-year-old Otto III took up government himself.  The most important offices in his court were occupied by Brandenburg-minded people.  The disputes about the inheritance of Warislaw IX were settled in 1463, with Otto receiving Pomerania-Stargard, the western part of Pomerania.

Otto died of the plague on 7 September 1464 and was buried in the Otten Church in Stettin.  He was unmarried and had no children.  With his death, the Pomerania-Stettin line of the House of Griffins died out.  It had begun with Duke Otto I (-1344).

Otto's death triggered the Stettin War of Succession.  Elector Frederick II claimed that Pomerania-Stettin was now a completed fief and that it should fall back to Brandenburg.  The Dukes in Wolgast claimed that it was a part of Pomerania and should fall to the surviving line of the House of Griffins.

According to legend, the dispute began when Otto was buried.  Mayor Albert Glinde of Stettin is said to have put Otto's helmet and shield in his grave, to indicate the end of his dynasty.  A gentleman from Eickstädt then jumped into the grave and took the helmet and shield out again, with the words "We still have hereditary, born rulers, the Dukes in Wolgast.  The helmet and shield belong to them."

Ancestors

See also 
 List of Pomeranian duchies and dukes

References 
 
 Martin Wehrmann: Geschichte von Pommern, vol. 1, 2nd ed., Verlag Friedrich Andreas Perthes, Gotha, 1919, reprinted: Augsburg, 1992, 

House of Griffins
Dukes of Pomerania
1444 births
1464 deaths
15th-century German people
15th-century deaths from plague (disease)